Telemark  is a traditional region, a former county, and a current electoral district in southern Norway. In 2020, Telemark merged with the former county of Vestfold to form the county of Vestfold og Telemark. Telemark borders the traditional regions and former counties of Vestfold, Buskerud, Hordaland, Rogaland and Aust-Agder.

The name Telemark means the "mark of the Thelir", the ancient North Germanic tribe that inhabited what is now known as Upper Telemark in the Migration Period and the Viking Age.

In the Middle Ages, the agricultural society of Upper Telemark was considered the most violent region of Norway. Today, half of the buildings from medieval times in Norway are located here. The dialects spoken in Upper Telemark also retain more elements of Old Norse than those spoken elsewhere in the country. Upper Telemark is also known as the birthplace of skiing.

The southern part of Telemark, Grenland, is more urban and influenced by trade with the Low Countries, northern Germany, Denmark and the British Isles.

Telemark has been one of Norway's most important industrial regions for centuries, marked in particular by the Norske Skog Union paper mills in Grenland and the Norsk Hydro heavy water and fertilizer production in Upper Telemark.

Telemark as a county is expected to be re-established by 1 January 2024, following a vote of the county council of Vestfold og Telemark on 15 February 2022 to split the newly established county into its respective counties that existed before the merger took place; Telemark and Vestfold.

History 

Telemark county was established as the fief Bratsberg in the late Middle Ages, during Norway's union with Denmark. With the introduction of absolute monarchy in 1662 it became a county, and it was renamed Telemark in 1919 and was a county until 2020. The county administration was in the port town Skien, which was in the early modern period Norway's most important city, ahead of Christiania.

Telemark consists of several distinct historical regions. It takes its name from the largest of them, which is now called Upper Telemark, but which was historically simply called Telemark. Telemark is named for the Thelir (Þilir in Old Norse), the ancient North Germanic tribe that inhabited what is now known as Upper Telemark since the Migration Period and during the Viking Age. The Norse form of the name was Þelamǫrk. The first element is the genitive plural case of Þilir while the last element is mǫrk "woodland, borderland, march".

Traditional Telemark, i.e. Upper Telemark, is located in the inland and comprises more than two thirds of it according to its traditional definition. Both in medieval times and later (Upper) Telemark was the region of Norway with the most self-owning farmers. It retained Norse culture to a larger degree than any other region in Norway, with respect to its more egalitarian organisation of society, religion, traditional values and language. Thus the people of Telemark were often described during the Middle Ages and early modern era as the most violent in Norway. The dialects of Upper Telemark are also the dialects of Norwegian that are closest to Old Norse. The farmers of Telemark were marked by a strong-willed conservatism and belief in their traditional values that often defied the central authorities of Denmark-Norway; for example they held on to aspects of both Old Norse religion and later of Catholicism longer than other regions in Norway. (Upper) Telemark traditionally lacks cities entirely.

Grenland and the Skien fjord are flatter regions located closer to or at the coast. Historically Grenland referred to what is now called Midt-Telemark, but over time the name Grenland has come to refer to the Skien fjord area. The latter is traditionally characterized by its cities and its involvement in seafaring and trade. It also includes several larger agricultural properties and estates, as well as industry. The culture and social structure are more urban, far less traditional, more influenced by contact with continental Europe and far less egalitarian. The most important city of the region, Skien, was historically one of Norway's most important cities, although its importance declined after the Napoleonic Wars. The playwright Henrik Ibsen was a native of Skien, and many of his plays are set in places reminiscent of the city and area.

During the Dano-Norwegian union the traditional regions of Telemark and Grenland/the Skien fjord became the fief (len) and later county (amt) of Bratsberg (Bradsberg). The fief and county was named after the farm Bratsberg, since this was the seat of the governor. In 1919 Bratsberg county was renamed Telemark. Despite this, Grenland retains a separate identity that is distinct from Telemark proper; the minority in the Storting voted for the name Grenland–Telemark in 1918.

(Upper) Telemark, particularly Kviteseid, is known as the birthplace of skiing as a modern sport. Telemark lent its name to Telemark skiing, a style invented by Sondre Norheim, and the characteristic Telemark landing of ski jumping. Telemark is also known as the centre of the Bunad movement. Telemark has more buildings from medieval times than any other Norwegian region.

Geography

Telemark is located in southeastern Norway, extending from the Hardangervidda mountain plateau in the North to the Skagerrak coast in the South. Telemark has a varied and scenic landscape, including a rugged coastline, valleys, lakes, hills mountains, and mountain plateaus.

Infrastructure 
The international road E18 goes through the southern parts of Telemark, namely Grenland and the municipality of Kragerø. E134, another important motorway and the fastest route between Oslo and Bergen, goes through the municipalities of Vinje, Tokke, Kviteseid, Seljord, Hjartdal and Notodden. RV36, stretching from Porsgrunn to Seljord, links the E18 and E134 motorways.

Telemark is well served by railways. The Sørlandet Line runs through the traditional districts of Vestmar and Midt-Telemark, serving the municipalities of Drangedal, Nome, Bø and Sauherad. Grenland is primarily served by the Vestfold Line, but also has connections through the Bratsberg Line which runs between Skien and Notodden.

From Langesund, Fjordline operates ferry services to Sweden and Denmark.

The main bus lines in the region are operated by Telemark Bilruter, serving western and middle parts of the region, and Nettbuss which serves the middle, eastern and southern parts of the region. Drangedal Bilruter serves the Vestmar region.

Population

The largest population centres are Skien, Porsgrunn, Notodden, Rjukan and Kragerø. Other important places are Bø, Seljord, Fyresdal and Vinje.

Coat-of-arms
The coat-of-arms is from modern times (1970). It shows an old type of battle axe, significant for the county.

Notable people from Telemark
 Myllarguten (1801–1872), legendary fiddler born in Sauherad
 Aasmund Olavsson Vinje (1818–1870), author born in Vinje
 Sondre Norheim (1825–1897), father of skiing born in Morgedal, Kviteseid
 August Cappelen (1827–1852), national romantic painter born in Skien
 Snowshoe Thompson (Jon Torsteinson-Rue) (1827–1876), American pioneer and father of California skiing
 Henrik Ibsen (1828–1906), author born in Skien
 John Anders Johnson (1832–1901), American politician
 Thorbjorn N. Mohn (1844–1899), American Lutheran church leader and first president of St. Olaf College
 Brynild Anundsen (1844–1913), founder of Decorah Posten
 Marcus Olaus Bockman (1849–1942), Norwegian-American Lutheran theologian
 Herbjørn Gausta (1854–1924), American artist. Born in Vestfjørddalen
Theodor Kittelsen (1857–1914), artist born in Kragerø
George Awsumb (1880–1959), architect born in Skien
 Vidkun Quisling (1887–1945), politician, collaborationist leader during World War II. Executed as a traitor, born in Fyresdal
 Aslaug Vaa (1889–1965), author born in Rauland
 Tarjei Vesaas (1897–1970), author born in Vinje
 Anne Grimdalen (1899–1961), sculptor born in Skafså, Tokke
 Eivind Groven (1901–1977), composer born in Lårdal, Tokke
 Dyre Vaa (1903–1980), sculptor born in Vinje
 Klaus Egge (1906–1979), composer born in Gransherad, Notodden
 Gunnar Sønsteby, (1918–2012), war hero born in Rjukan, Tinn
 Hans Herbjørnsrud (1938–), author born in Heddal, Notodden
 Tor Åge Bringsværd (1939–), author born in Skien
 Agnes Buen Garnås (1946–), musician born in Jondal
 Kåre Nordstoga (1954–), musician born in Notodden
 Bugge Wesseltoft (1964-), musician born in Porsgrunn
 Gisle Kverndokk (1967–), composer born in Skien
 Jørn Lande (1968–), hard rock / heavy metal singer born in Rjukan
Bård Tufte Johansen (1969–), comedian born in Skien
 Odd Nordstoga (1972–), musician born in Vinje
 Frode Johnsen (1974–), footballer born in Skien
 Terje Haakonsen (1974–), snowboarder born in Vinje
 Ihsahn (Vegard Sverre Tveitan) (1975–), black/extreme metal musician born in Notodden

Districts

The county is conventionally divided into traditional districts. Traditionally the county is mainly divided into Upper Telemark (historically called simply Telemark or more recently Telemark proper) and Grenland. Upper Telemark is sometimes subdivided into Vest-Telemark and Aust-Telemark. The name Lower Telemark traditionally refers to Grenland and Midt-Telemark, but was more of an administrative region than a cultural one. Regardless of definition, Upper Telemark constitutes the largest part by far. For example, the modern provostship of Upper Telemark comprises 12 municipalities and more than 80% of Telemark, also including Midt-Telemark.

An additional district, Vestmar is disputed. The district borders of this county are highly overlapping and to a certain extent undefined and/or disputed.

Municipalities

Cities

 Brevik
 Kragerø
 Langesund
 Notodden
 Porsgrunn
 Rjukan
 Skien
 Stathelle

Parishes

 Atrå
 Austbygdi
 Bamble
 Brevik
 Brunkeberg
 Bø
 Dal
 Drangedal
 Eidanger
 Eidsborg
 Flatdal
 Fyresdal
 Gjerpen
 Gransherad
 Grungedal
 Heddal
 Helgen
 Herre
 Hitterdal, see Heddal
 Hjartdal
 Holla (Hollen)
 Hovin
 Hægland
 Høydalsmo
 Kilebygda
 Kragerø
 Kroken, see Drangedal
 Kviteseid (Hvidesøe)
 Old Kviteseid (Hvidesøe)
 Langesund
 Lisleherad (Lilleherred)
 Lunde
 Lårdal
 Mo
 Moland
 Mæl
 Mælum
 Møsstrand
 Nes
 Nesland
 Nissedal
 Notodden
 Our Lady of Good Counsel Church, Porsgrunn
 Porsgrunn
 Rauland
 Rjukan
 Sannidal (Sannikedal)
 Saude
 Sauherad (Saude)
 Sauland
 Seljord
 Siljan
 Skafså
 Skien
 Skåtøy
 Slemdal, see Siljan
 Solum
 Stathelle
 Tinn
 Treungen
 Tuddal
 Tørdal (Tørrisdal)
 Vestre Porsgrunn
 Veum
 Vinje
 Vrådal
 Ytre Flåbygd
 Østre Porsgrunn
 Øyfjell
 Åmotsdal
 Brevik Branch (LDS, 1852–1864)
 Langesund Branch (LDS, 1852–1907)
 Skien (Frie Apostoliske, 1856–1892)
 Porsgrunn and Skien (Great Britain Consulate Birth Register, 1876–1891)
 Kragerø (Great Britain Death Register), 1895

Villages

 Akkerhaugen
 Arabygdi
 Austbygdi
 Bjervamoen
 Bolkesjø
 Bostrak
 Brevik
 Brunkeberg
 Bø
 Dalen
 Edland
 Eidanger
 Eidsborg
 Eidstod
 Flatdal
 Folkestad
 Gautefall
 Gvarv
 Haukeli
 Heddal
 Helle
 Henneseid
 Herre
 Hjuksebø
 Hjuksevelta
 Holtsås
 Hoppestad
 Hovin
 Høydalsmo
 Jomfruland
 Kil
 Klovholt
 Landsverk
 Langangen
 Lunde
 Lårdal
 Miland
 Neslandsvatn
 Nissedal
 Nordagutu
 Portør
 Prestestranda
 Rauland
 Rudsgrendi
 Sannidal
 Sauland
 Skotfoss
 Skåtøy
 Sneltvedt
 Snurråsen
 Tinnoset
 Treungen
 Tuddal
 Tveitsund
 Tørdal
 Ulefoss
 Vadfoss
 Valebø
 Vinjesvingen
 Vrådal
 Yli
 Øyane
 Øyfjell
 Åfoss
 Åmdals Verk
 Åmotsdal

Former municipalities

 Brevik
 Bø
 Eidanger
 Gjerpen
 Gransherad
 Heddal
 Holla
 Hovin
 Langesund
 Lunde
 Lårdal
 Mo
 Rauland
 Sannidal
 Sauherad
 Skåtøy
 Solum
 Stathelle

Further reading

References

External links

Telemark county
Destination Marketing Organization for Telemark
Vestfold og Telemark county

 
Former counties of Norway
2020 disestablishments in Norway
Petty kingdoms of Norway
States and territories disestablished in 2020